Patricia García (born 2 December 1989) is a Spanish rugby union player. She competed for the Spanish women's national rugby sevens team at the 2016 Summer Olympics. She has played in 89 matches in the Women's Sevens Series and amassed over 300 points.

García was in the squad that played for the last qualifying spot for the 2016 Olympics. She was also named in Spain's squad for the 2013 Rugby World Cup Sevens in Russia. She played provincially at the top flight of Spanish rugby for Olimpico Pozuelo, before moving to the newly established Exeter Chiefs Women, in the English top flight league, the Premier 15s.

References

External links
 Personal website
 
 

1989 births
Living people
Spain international women's rugby union players
Spain international women's rugby sevens players
Olympic rugby sevens players of Spain
Rugby sevens players at the 2016 Summer Olympics
Rugby union players from the Community of Madrid
People from San Lorenzo de El Escorial